The NATO Standardization Office (NSO) (former NATO Standardization Agency, NSA; French: Bureau OTAN de normalisation) is a NATO agency created in 1951 to handle standardization activities for NATO. The NSA was formed through the merger of the Military Agency for Standardization and the Office for NATO Standardization. During the Agency Reforms, the NSA was transformed to the NATO Standardization Office (NSO) on 1 July 2014, headed by the Director of the NATO Standardization Office (DNSO).

The NSO is composed of military and civilian staff that was created to be responsible for standardization for both the Military Committee and the North Atlantic Council It also provides standardization to NATO members military forces, with the goal of interoperability between member nations. It is also the responsibility of the NSO to initiate, administrate over and promulgate a Standardization Agreement (STANAG).

NSO headquarters is located at the main NATO headquarters at Boulevard Léopold III, B-1110 Brussels, which is in Haren, part of the City of Brussels municipality.

History
On October 24, 1950, during the fourth meeting of the Military Committee, was the first instance of there being a need for a standardization agency. The first NATO standardization agency, the Military Standardization Agency (MSA), was established on January 15, 1951 in London (it was later chartered on January 30). The MSA was created for military-only standardization. A year later, the agency was renamed to the Military Agency for Standardization (MAS). In November 1970, the agency was moved to its current location in Brussels, Belgium, which is also the location of NATO headquarters.

A proposal was submitted in 1991 to create the NATO Standardization Agency however it was not created. Instead, a standardization agency for civilian staff was created, the Office for NATO Standardization (ONS). The ONS was established in 1994 and later implemented in 1995 by the North Atlantic Council. From 1998 to 2000, NATO formally merged the two agencies, the MAS and the ONS, together and renamed it to the NATO Standardization Agency, which served both the military and civilian staff.

On 1 July 2014 the NATO Standardization Agency (NSA) became the NATO Standardization Office (NSO).

Structure

The NSA is an independent agency that receives general oversight and direction from a board of directors called the NATO Committee for Standardization (NCS) which are under the authority of the North Atlantic Council.  The NSA, NCS and the NATO Standardization Staff Group (NSSG) are the components that comprise the NATO Standardization Organization (NSO). The NSA serves as the executive branch of the NSO. The NSSG is a small group of staff which aids the Director in coordinating activities within the agency. Furthermore, the NSA is divided into an administrative unit and five branches: Air, Army, Joint, Naval and Policy and Coordination.

The Director of the NATO Standardization Agency (DNSA) is the head authority figure of the NSA. The DNSA serves as the primary advisor to the Military Committee and to the Secretary General of NATO. The Director is selected by the NCS after an endorsement from the Military Committee. The Secretary General then formally appoints the DNSA for (normally) a three-year term. The Secretary General of NATO appointed former MAS director rear admiral Jan H. Eriksen as the first DNSA on October 1, 2001. The current Director of the NATO Standardization Office is Brigadier General Zoltan Gulyas.

List of DNSAs and DNSOs

Standardization Agreements

A Standardization Agreement (STANAG) is a document that defines varies processes, procedures, terms, and conditions for common military and technical procedures or equipment between  NATO nations. Once they are adopted by a nation, a STANAG allows members of the alliance to cooperate with that nation. The DNSA is who has the authority to promulgate a STANAG or an Allied Publication (AP). The NSA publishes STANAGs in a database in English and French on their website. This is a partial list of STANAGs with related articles:

Further reading

See also
Structure of NATO
Standardization Agreement

References

External links

2001 in military history
 
Organizations established in 2001
Standards organisations in Belgium
Military standardization
Standards organizations
Interoperability